James Morris may refer to:

Arts
James Morris (artist) (1908–1989), British war artist during the Second World War
James Morris (bass-baritone) (born 1947), American opera singer
James Shepherd Morris (1931–2006), Scottish architect, partner in Morris and Steedman
Jimmy Driftwood (James Corbitt Morris, 1907–1998), American folk music songwriter and musician
James McGrath Morris (born 1954), American biographer
Jan Morris (1926–2020), British historian, author and travel writer; formerly known as James Morris
James Morris (born 1968), British musician with Mephiskapheles, journalist and technology writer

Military
James Morris III (1752–1820), Revolutionary War officer, coeducation pioneer, namesake of Morris, Connecticut
James Nicoll Morris (1763–1830), British admiral

Politics
James Morris (British politician) (born 1967), MP for Halesowen and Rowley Regis
James Morris (Canada West politician) (1798–1865), Canadian politician and banker
James Morris (Quebec politician) (1857–1931), farmer, marble and granite dealer and political figure in Quebec
James R. Morris (1819–1899), U.S. Representative from Ohio
James Toulmin Morris (1833–1912), South Australian politician
James Morris (North Dakota judge) (1893–1980), North Dakota Attorney General

Sports
Hillbilly Jim (born 1952), retired American professional wrestler whose real name is James Morris
James Ellsworth (wrestler) (born 1984), American professional wrestler whose real name is James Ellsworth Morris
James Morris (baseball), 19th-century baseball player
James Morris (cricketer) (born 1985), English cricketer
Jamie Morris (born 1965), American football player
James Morris (American football) (born 1991), American football player
James Morris (golfer) (1856–1906), Scottish golfer
James Morris (footballer, born 1864) (1864–?), Welsh footballer
James Morris (footballer, born 2000), English footballer
James Morris (footballer, born 2001), English footballer

Others
James H. Morris (born 1941), American computer scientist
James Ward Morris (1890–1960), United States federal judge
James Morris (theology) (born 1949), Islamic theologian
James Craik Morris (1870–1944), bishop of Panama, and of Louisiana
James Morris (banker), Governor of the Bank of England
James Morris Gale (1830-1903), Civil Engineer for the Glasgow Corporation Water Works

See also
Jim Morris (disambiguation)
James Morice (1539–1597), English MP for Colchester